The Reporters is an American newsmagazine television program that aired on Fox from July 30, 1988 to March 31, 1990.

Format
The Reporters was structured much in the style of the syndicated program A Current Affair, except that there was no regular "host" role. As A Current Affair was produced for syndication by Fox, there was a considerable overlap in subject matter and some reporters even appeared on both programs.

Some segments from the program have since been seen in the present day in a historical context on Fox News as part of their compilation series, From the Fox Files.

References

 Brooks, Tim and Marsh, Earle, The Complete Directory to Prime Time Network and Cable TV Shows

External links
 

Fox Broadcasting Company original programming
1988 American television series debuts
Infotainment
1980s American television news shows
1990s American television news shows
1990 American television series endings